Meng Lizhi (born 31 October 1974) is a Chinese professional field hockey player who represented China at the 2008 Summer Olympics in Beijing. The team finished last in their group, and finished 11th after beating South Africa.

References

External links
 

Chinese male field hockey players
Olympic field hockey players of China
Field hockey players at the 2008 Summer Olympics
1974 births
Living people
Field hockey players at the 2002 Asian Games
Asian Games competitors for China
Sportspeople from Inner Mongolia